Karen Nelson is a Jamaican-born American microbiologist (specializing in human microbiome research) who was formerly president of the J. Craig Venter Institute (JCVI).  On July 6, 2021 she joined Thermo Fisher Scientific as Chief Scientific Officer.

Education 
Nelson studied her undergraduate degree at the University of the West Indies and earned a Ph.D. from Cornell University.

Career and research 
Nelson is a prominent expert in microbial genomics and metagenomics, with applications to human health. She is noted for her research on Thermotoga maritima at The Institute for Genomic Research (TIGR) which resulted in the publication of the genome of that bacterium, and which demonstrated the existence of horizontal gene transfer. Nelson is also known for her work in human microbiome research and her current research focuses on interactions between human microbiome and various diseases. Her extensive expertise involves areas of microbial ecology, microbial genomics, microbial physiology and metagenomics, which led to her team publishing the first human microbiome study in 2006.

Nelson was appointed president of JCVI in 2012 after serving as the director of its Rockville Campus since 2010. Prior to being appointed President, she held a number of other positions at the Institute, including Director of JCVI's Rockville Campus, and Director of Human Microbiology and Metagenomics in the Department of Human Genomic Medicine at JCVI.

She has authored or co-authored over 200 peer reviewed publications, edited three books, and is currently Editor-in-Chief of the journal Microbial Ecology and the newly announced PNAS Nexus. Scientific American named Nelson as one of biotechnology's "leading lights" in its 2015 "The Worldview 100."

Boards and panels
 Editor in Chief, PNAS Nexus
 Editor in Chief, Microbial Ecology
 Editor in Chief, Advances in Microbial Ecology
 Editorial Board Member, BMC Genomics
 Editorial Board Member, Giga Science
 Editorial Board Member, Central European Journal of Biology
 Board Member, Board on Life Sciences, National Academy of Sciences
 Member, Standing Committee on Support to the DoD's Programs to Counter Biological Threats, National Research Council

Professional organizations
 American Society for Microbiology

Honors and awards
 Helmholtz International Fellow Award
 Fellow, American Society for Microbiology
 ARCS Scientist of the Year (2017)
 Elected Member, National Academy of Sciences (2017)

References 

Year of birth missing (living people)
Living people
Cornell University alumni
University of the West Indies alumni
American microbiologists
Evolutionary biologists
Women evolutionary biologists
Jamaican emigrants to the United States
Expatriate academics in the United States
21st-century American women scientists
21st-century American biologists
Jamaican women scientists
Women microbiologists
African-American biologists
Jamaican biologists
Ecology journal editors
21st-century African-American women
21st-century African-American scientists